Mansale is a surname. Notable people with the surname include:

Andrew Mansale (born 1988), Vanuatuan cricketer
Chikau Mansale (born 1983), Vanuatuan footballer
Don Mansale (born 1991), Vanuatuan footballer

Surnames of Oceanian origin